Marcus Beach is a coastal suburb in the Shire of Noosa, Queensland, Australia.

Geography 
The suburb takes its name from the beach Marcus Beach which extends north in neighbouring Castaways Beach.

The suburb is bounded to the east by the Coral Sea, to the south-east by Peregian Creek, to the west by Lake Weyba and to the north-east (in part) by Castaways Creek.

Marcus Creek flows though the suburb immediately north of the residential area and enters the Coral Sea.

History
Marcus Beach was named after the property developer, Marcus Burke, the grandson of T.M. Burke.

Historically and currently, Marcus Beach is within the local government area of Shire of Noosa (but between 2008 and 2013 it was within Sunshine Coast Region).

References

Further reading 
 

Suburbs of Noosa Shire, Queensland
Beaches of Queensland